Transfiguration is an oil-on-canvas painting of the Gospel episode the Transfiguration of Jesus, painted in 1604–1605 by Peter Paul Rubens and now in the Musée des Beaux-Arts de Nancy.

References

1605 paintings
Paintings by Peter Paul Rubens
Paintings in the Museum of Fine Arts of Nancy
Paintings of the Transfiguration of Jesus
Paintings depicting Saint Peter
Paintings depicting John the Apostle